Isonomeutis is a genus of moths in the Copromorphidae family. All species are endemic to New Zealand.

Taxonomy 
This genus was first described by Edward Meyrick in 1888.

Description
Meyrick described the genus as follows:

Species
Isonomeutis amauropa Meyrick, 1888
Isonomeutis restincta Meyrick, 1923

References

Copromorphidae
Moths of New Zealand
Taxa named by Edward Meyrick
Endemic fauna of New Zealand
Endemic moths of New Zealand